Erdinç Ecevit Yıldız is a Turkish-Dutch musician best known as vocalist and bağlama player for Anatolian rock band Altin Gün.

Biography
According to Altin Gün bandmate Daniel Smienk, Erdinç was born in the Netherlands to Turkish parents.

Music career
In 2016, Erdinç responded to an ad posted on Facebook by Jasper Verhulst who was seeking to form a psychedelic Turkish folk band which would soon become known as Altin Gün. Erdinç was recruited to the band as one of two lead vocalists of Turkish origin - the other being Merve Daşdemir.

The band has released four studio albums since their debut album in 2018. In 2019, their sophomore album, Gece was nominated for the 62nd Annual Grammy Awards (2019) in the Best World Music Album category. Together they have made multiple tours of Europe and North America and have performed at Coachella. Their fifth studio album will be released in March 2023.

At a 2019 show in Ontario, Erdinç performed with broken ribs after suffering a frisbee accident.

References

Living people
Turkish singers
Turkish male singers
Bağlama players
Anatolian rock musicians
Year of birth missing (living people)